Willard is an unincorporated community in Fallon County, Montana, United States. The community had a post office until September 9, 1995; it still has its own ZIP code, 59354.

The post office was established in 1910 on the stage road between Baker and Ekalaka.

References

Unincorporated communities in Fallon County, Montana
Unincorporated communities in Montana